Żelichowo  is a village (German: Selchow) in the administrative district of Gmina Krzyż Wielkopolski, within Czarnków-Trzcianka County, Greater Poland Voivodeship, in west-central Poland.

References

Villages in Czarnków-Trzcianka County